George Plunkett may refer to:

 George Noble Plunkett (1851–1948), Irish nationalist
 George Oliver Plunkett (1894–1944), son of George Noble Plunkett, Irish Republican and leading member of the IRA
 George Plunkett (photographer) (1913–2006), English photographer
 George Thomas Plunkett (died 1827), Irish Roman Catholic clergyman

See also
 George W. Plunkitt (1842–1924), New York state senator